The 1978 Pacific typhoon season was a very active season that produced 31 tropical storms, 16 typhoons and one intense typhoon. It has no official bounds; it ran year-round in 1978, but most tropical cyclones tend to form in the northwestern Pacific Ocean between June and December. These dates conventionally delimit the period of each year when most tropical cyclones form in the northwestern Pacific Ocean.

The scope of this article is limited to the Pacific Ocean, north of the equator and west of the international date line. Storms that form east of the date line and north of the equator are called hurricanes; see 1978 Pacific hurricane season. Tropical Storms formed in the entire west pacific basin were assigned a name by the Joint Typhoon Warning Center. Tropical depressions in this basin have the "W" suffix added to their number. Tropical depressions that enter or form in the Philippine area of responsibility are assigned a name by the Philippine Atmospheric, Geophysical and Astronomical Services Administration or PAGASA. This can often result in the same storm having two names.

Seasonal summary 

33 tropical depressions formed this year in the Western Pacific, of which 29 became tropical storms. 15 storms reached typhoon intensity, of which 1 reached super typhoon strength. Many of the storms either remained at sea or failed to do any damage.

Systems

Severe Tropical Storm Nadine 

Nadine stayed at sea and was the first severe tropical storm of the season. It lived at least 1 week.

Typhoon Olive (Atang) 

In the Philippines, Typhoon Olive (Atang) killed 3 people and left 3,500 homeless. A lengthened ex-”FS” ship of Compania Maritima was caught in it, the MV Leyte. She was wrecked in the southwestern portion of Sibuyan Island trying to reach shelter. She was then on a Manila-Cebu voyage.

Tropical Storm Polly (Bising) 

Polly was the first of three short-lived June systems.

Tropical Storm Rose (Klaring) 

Rose was the second of three weak June systems.

Tropical Storm Shirley (Deling) 

Shirley hit Vietnam as a tropical storm.

Typhoon Trix 

Trix did a loop.

Typhoon Virginia 

Virginia stayed largely at sea.

Typhoon Wendy (Emang) 

Wendy ultimately hit Japan.

Severe Tropical Storm Agnes 

Agnes formed on July 24, made a complete loop, and struck China on July 29 with winds of 55 mph after peaking at 65 mph. It dissipated the 30th. In Hong Kong Tropical Storm Agnes killed 3 people.

Tropical Storm Bonnie 

Bonnie hit Vietnam.

Typhoon Carmen (Iliang) 

Carmen was short-lived.

Tropical Storm Della (Heling) 

Della landed in Taiwan and China.

Tropical Depression Loleng 

Only recognized by PAGASA.

Tropical Storm 13W 

13W was weak but hit Japan.

Typhoon Elaine (Miding) 

Elaine struck the Northern Philippines and the Chinese province of Guangdong.

Typhoon Faye 

Faye stayed at sea.

Tropical Storm Gloria (Norming) 

Gloria stayed at sea.

Tropical Storm Hester 

Hester stayed away from land.

Typhoon Irma (Ruping) 

Irma, the eighth typhoon of the 1978 season, developed in the monsoon trough southeast of Taiwan. It made landfall in Honshu, Japan. With winds of up to 120 km/h, Typhoon Irma killed at least 6 people and made about 3,000 homeless. Four people were missing and about 100 were injured by floods and landslides in southwestern Japan. It destroyed or damaged 1,597 homes and left 6,266 homes flooded. Irma smashed windows, overturned cars, and capsized several fishing boats. Several athletes at the Japan-China Friendship Track and Field Meet in Kitakyushu were injured when a freak gust blew them ten feet in the air. A Liberian-registered tanker was swept from its moorings off the port of Kure and drifted for nearly 5 kilometers before running aground off a small island in the Inland Sea. Irma remained a typhoon for only 12 hours becoming the shortest-lived typhoon of the season.

Typhoon Judy 

Judy did not impact land.

Severe Tropical Storm Kit (Uding) 

Kit hit Vietnam and The Philippines.

Typhoon Lola (Weling) 

Lola hit China and the Philippines.

Typhoon Mamie 

Mamie recurved out to sea.

Severe Tropical Storm Nina (Yaning) 

According to the official reports, 59 people died and more than 500,000 were in evacuation centers in the Philippines.

Typhoon Ora (Aning) 

Ora brushed Taiwan.

Tropical Depression 25W 

25W did not affect land.

Tropical Depression 26W (Bidang) 

26W followed 25W.

Typhoon Phyllis 

Phyllis recurved from Japan.

Typhoon Rita (Kading) 

Tropical Depression 28 developed October 15. Three and a half days later, it strengthened into a tropical storm. Rita became a typhoon late on October 19. Rita reached Category 5 status on October 23, reaching a minimum central pressure of 878 millibars on October 25, only 8 milibars higher than Typhoon Tip's record set in 1979. After spending over three consecutive days at that intensity, Rita weakened to a Category 4 and smashed ashore on Luzon. Rita stayed a typhoon during its entire passage over the Philippines and emerged into the South China Sea as a minimal typhoon. Rita then decayed slowly and dissipated as a depression near the coast of Vietnam. The typhoon caused considerable damage and loss of life in the Philippines, though exact numbers are unknown.

Tropical Storm Twenty-seven 

Tropical Storm 27 was weak and short-lived.

Severe Tropical Storm Tess 

A tropical depression developed on October 31. The depression was upgraded to a tropical storm on November 2. Tess continued to intensify and reached its peak intensity as a  storm; just short of typhoon status. The storm became extratropical on November 7.

Tropical Depression 30W (Delang) 

30W came close to land.

Typhoon Viola (Esang) 

On November 16, the disturbance was upgraded to Tropical Depression 33. Based on an improved satellite signature, TD 33 was upgraded to Tropical Storm Viola at 1200 UTC November 17. Viola continued to intensify as the storm moved on a northwestward track. Late on November 19 reconnaissance aircraft confirmed that Viola's surface pressure had fallen to 977 mb; and, that an eye was beginning to form. Early on November 20, Viola was upgraded to a typhoon. Viola recurved away from Luzon on November 22. By the next day, the storm had already weakened to a category 1 and further weakened to a tropical storm. Viola dissipated on November 24.

Severe Tropical Storm Winnie 

A tropical depression developed on November 25. It started to intensify while moving on a north-northwestward track. By November 28, it was upgraded to a tropical storm and was named Winnie. Winnie became extratropical early on November 30.

Tropical Depression Garding 

The last system of the season, Tropical Depression 63W(Garding) was named by PAGASA.

Storm names 

During the season 28 named tropical cyclones developed in the Western Pacific and were named by the Joint Typhoon Warning Center, when it was determined that they had become tropical storms. These names were contributed to a revised list from late 1950. However the JTWC changed their naming scheme by the next year, now including both female and male names.

One name, Susan, developed over the Central Pacific and was named from this list. The storm never became a part of the West Pacific basin.

Philippines 

The Philippine Atmospheric, Geophysical and Astronomical Services Administration uses its own naming scheme for tropical cyclones in their area of responsibility. PAGASA assigns names to tropical depressions that form within their area of responsibility and any tropical cyclone that might move into their area of responsibility. Should the list of names for a given year prove to be insufficient, names are taken from an auxiliary list, the first 6 of which are published each year before the season starts. Names not retired from this list will be used again in the 1982 season. This is the same list used for the 1974 season. PAGASA uses its own naming scheme that starts in the Filipino alphabet, with names of Filipino female names ending with "ng" (A, B, K, D, etc.).

Retirement 
Due to extreme damages and death toll caused by Typhoon Rita (Kading), PAGASA retired the name Kading in its auxiliary list. The name replaced was Katring.

Season effects 
This table will list all the storms that developed in the northwestern Pacific Ocean west of the International Date Line and north of the equator during 1978. It will include their intensity, duration, name, areas affected, deaths, missing persons (in parentheses), and damage totals. Classification and intensity values will be based on estimations conducted by the JMA. All damage figures will be in 1978 USD. Damages and deaths from a storm will include when the storm was a precursor wave or an extratropical low.

|-
| Nadine ||  || bgcolor=#| || bgcolor=#| || bgcolor=#| || Marshall Islands ||  None ||  None ||
|-
| Olive (Atang) ||  || bgcolor=#| || bgcolor=#| || bgcolor=#| || Palau, Philippines, Taiwan ||  Unknown ||  ||
|-
| TD ||  || bgcolor=#| || bgcolor=#| || bgcolor=#| || Philippines ||  None ||  None ||
|-
| TD ||  || bgcolor=#| || bgcolor=#| || bgcolor=#| || Philippines ||  None ||  None ||
|-
| TD ||  || bgcolor=#| || bgcolor=#| || bgcolor=#| || Philippines ||  None ||  None ||
|-
| Polly (Bising) ||  || bgcolor=#| || bgcolor=#| || bgcolor=#| || Ryukyu Islands, Japan ||  None ||  None ||
|-
| Rose (Klaring) ||  || bgcolor=#| || bgcolor=#| || bgcolor=#| || Philippines, Taiwan ||  None ||  None ||
|-
| Shirley (Deling) ||  || bgcolor=#| || bgcolor=#| || bgcolor=#| || Philippines, Vietnam, Cambodia ||  Unknown ||  None ||
|-
| TD ||  || bgcolor=#| || bgcolor=#| || bgcolor=#| || Japan ||  None ||  None ||
|-
| Trix ||  || bgcolor=#| || bgcolor=#| || bgcolor=#| || Ryukyu Islands, China ||  Unknown ||  Unknown ||
|-
| TD ||  || bgcolor=#| || bgcolor=#| || bgcolor=#| || None ||  None ||  None ||
|-
| Wendy (Emang) ||  || bgcolor=#| || bgcolor=#| || bgcolor=#| || Ryukyu Islands, Japan ||  None ||  None ||
|-
| Virginia ||  || bgcolor=#| || bgcolor=#| || bgcolor=#| || Japan ||  None || None ||
|-
| Agnes ||  || bgcolor=#| || bgcolor=#| || bgcolor=#| || South China ||  None ||  ||
|-
| TD ||  || bgcolor=#| || bgcolor=#| || bgcolor=#| || None ||  None ||  None ||
|-
| TD ||  || bgcolor=#| || bgcolor=#| || bgcolor=#| || Taiwan ||  None ||  None ||
|-
| Gading ||  || bgcolor=#| || bgcolor=#| || bgcolor=#| || Taiwan ||  None ||  None ||
|-
| Bonnie ||  || bgcolor=#| || bgcolor=#| || bgcolor=#| || South China, Vietnam ||  None ||  None ||
|-
| Carmen (Iliang) ||  || bgcolor=#| || bgcolor=#| || bgcolor=#| || Ryukyu Islands, East China, Korea ||  Unknown ||  None ||
|-
| Della (Heling) ||  || bgcolor=#| || bgcolor=#| || bgcolor=#| || Philippines, Taiwan, China ||  None ||  None ||
|-
| Loleng ||  || bgcolor=#| || bgcolor=#| || bgcolor=#| || Philippines, South China ||  None ||  None ||
|-
| TD ||  || bgcolor=#| || bgcolor=#| || bgcolor=#| || Taiwan ||  None ||  None ||
|-
| 13W ||  || bgcolor=#| || bgcolor=#| || bgcolor=#| || Japan ||  None ||  None ||
|-
| TD ||  || bgcolor=#| || bgcolor=#| || bgcolor=#| || Palau ||  None ||  None ||
|-
| TD ||  || bgcolor=#| || bgcolor=#| || bgcolor=#| || Taiwan ||  None ||  None ||
|-
| Elaine (Miding) ||  || bgcolor=#| || bgcolor=#| || bgcolor=#| || Philippines, South China ||  Unknown ||  Unknown ||
|-
| TD ||  || bgcolor=#| || bgcolor=#| || bgcolor=#| || Korean Peninsula ||  None ||  None ||
|-
| TD ||  || bgcolor=#| || bgcolor=#| || bgcolor=#| || Ryukyu Islands ||  None ||  None ||
|-
| Faye ||  || bgcolor=#| || bgcolor=#| || bgcolor=#| || Mariana Islands, Taiwan ||  None ||  None ||
|-
| Gloria (Norming) ||  || bgcolor=#| || bgcolor=#| || bgcolor=#| || Ryukyu Islands ||  None ||  None ||
|-
| Hester ||  || bgcolor=#| || bgcolor=#| || bgcolor=#| || Japan ||  None ||  None ||
|-
| Oyang ||  || bgcolor=#| || bgcolor=#| || bgcolor=#| || Philippines ||  None ||  None ||
|-
| TD ||  || bgcolor=#| || bgcolor=#| || bgcolor=#| || None ||  None ||  None ||
|-
| TD ||  || bgcolor=#| || bgcolor=#| || bgcolor=#| || Ryukyu Islands, Taiwan ||  None ||  None ||
|-
| Irma (Ruping) ||  || bgcolor=#| || bgcolor=#| || bgcolor=#| || Taiwan, Ryukyu Islands, Japan||  None ||  ||
|-
| Pasing ||  || bgcolor=#| || bgcolor=#| || bgcolor=#| || Vietnam ||  None ||  None ||
|-
| Judy ||  || bgcolor=#| || bgcolor=#| || bgcolor=#| || None ||  None ||  None ||
|-
| TD ||  || bgcolor=#| || bgcolor=#| || bgcolor=#| || Taiwan ||  None ||  None ||
|-
| Susang ||  || bgcolor=#| || bgcolor=#| || bgcolor=#| || Palau, Philippines, Vietnam ||  None ||  None ||
|-
| TD ||  || bgcolor=#| || bgcolor=#| || bgcolor=#| || Palau ||  None ||  None ||
|-
| Kit (Uding) ||  || bgcolor=#| || bgcolor=#| || bgcolor=#| || Philippines, South China, Vietnam ||  Unknown ||  Unknown ||
|-
| Tering ||  || bgcolor=#| || bgcolor=#| || bgcolor=#| || Philippines ||  None ||  None ||
|-
| TD ||  || bgcolor=#| || bgcolor=#| || bgcolor=#| || Ryukyu Islands ||  None ||  None ||
|-
| Lola (Weling) ||  || bgcolor=#| || bgcolor=#| || bgcolor=#| || Philippines, South China ||  Unknown ||  Unknown ||
|-
| Mamie ||  || bgcolor=#| || bgcolor=#| || bgcolor=#| || None ||  None ||  None ||
|-
| TD ||  || bgcolor=#| || bgcolor=#| || bgcolor=#| || None ||  None ||  None ||
|-
| Nina (Yaning) ||  || bgcolor=#| || bgcolor=#| || bgcolor=#| || Philippines, South China, Vietnam ||  Unknown ||  ||
|-
| Ora (Aning) ||  || bgcolor=#| || bgcolor=#| || bgcolor=#| || Taiwan, Ryukyu Islands ||  None ||  None ||
|-
| 25W ||  || bgcolor=#| || bgcolor=#| || bgcolor=#| || None ||  None ||  None ||
|-
| 26W (Bidang) ||  || bgcolor=#| || bgcolor=#| || bgcolor=#| || Caroline Islands, Philippines ||  None ||  None ||
|-
| Phyllis ||  || bgcolor=#| || bgcolor=#| || bgcolor=#| || None ||  None ||  None ||
|-
| Rita (Kading) ||  || bgcolor=#| || bgcolor=#| || bgcolor=#| || Caroline Islands, Mariana Islands, Philippines ||  || > ||
|-
| Twenty-seven ||  || bgcolor=#| || bgcolor=#| || bgcolor=#| || Philippines, Vietnam ||  None ||  None ||
|-
| Tess ||  || bgcolor=#| || bgcolor=#| || bgcolor=#| || Philippines, South China, Vietnam ||  None ||  None ||
|-
| TD ||  || bgcolor=#| || bgcolor=#| || bgcolor=#| || Vietnam ||  None ||  None ||
|-
| TD ||  || bgcolor=#| || bgcolor=#| || bgcolor=#| || Philippines ||  None ||  None ||
|-
| TD ||  || bgcolor=#| || bgcolor=#| || bgcolor=#| || Vietnam ||  None ||  None ||
|-
| 30W (Delang) ||  || bgcolor=#| || bgcolor=#| || bgcolor=#| || Philippines ||  None ||  None ||
|-
| Viola (Esang) ||  || bgcolor=#| || bgcolor=#| || bgcolor=#| || Caroline Islands ||  None ||  None ||
|-
| TD ||  || bgcolor=#| || bgcolor=#| || bgcolor=#| || Malaysia ||  None ||  None ||
|-
| Winnie ||  || bgcolor=#| || bgcolor=#| || bgcolor=#| || Mariana Islands ||  None ||  None ||
|-
| TD ||  || bgcolor=#| || bgcolor=#| || bgcolor=#| || None ||  None ||  None ||
|-
| Garding ||  || bgcolor=#| || bgcolor=#| || bgcolor=#| || Philippines ||  Unknown ||  None ||
|-

See also 

 Pacific typhoon season
 1978 Pacific hurricane season
 1978 Atlantic hurricane season
 1978 North Indian Ocean cyclone season
 Australian region cyclone seasons: 1977–78, 1978–79
 South Pacific cyclone seasons: 1977–78, 1978–79
 South-West Indian Ocean cyclone seasons: 1977–78, 1978–79

References

External links 
 Japan Meteorological Agency
 Joint Typhoon Warning Center .
 China Meteorological Agency
 National Weather Service Guam
 Hong Kong Observatory
 Macau Meteorological Geophysical Services
 Korea Meteorological Agency
 Philippine Atmospheric, Geophysical and Astronomical Services Administration
 Taiwan Central Weather Bureau
 Digital Typhoon - Typhoon Images and Information
 Typhoon2000 Philippine typhoon website